The Zen Alligators were an Irish short-lived rhythm and blues band, that arose out of the ashes of Horslips. Fronted by two ex-members of Horslips, guitarist and vocalist Johnny Fean and drummer Eamon Carr, they were joined by bass player Gary Eglington and Philip Fay on guitar.

They released a number of singles in late 1980 and 1981, including "The Invisible Man", "Berlin Wall" and "Voodoo", but no album was ever released. They appeared at a number of local festivals including  the (Paul Funge) Gorey Arts Festival on 13th August 1981.

References

Irish musical groups
Rhythm and blues musical groups